Novoilyinka is a rural locality (a selo) and the administrative center of Novoilyinsky Selsoviet, Khabarsky District, Altai Krai, Russia. The population was 1,369 as of 2013. There are 22 streets.

Geography 
Novoilyinka is located near the Burla river, 20 km southwest of Khabary (the district's administrative centre) by road. Utyanka is the nearest rural locality.

References 

Rural localities in Khabarsky District